My Little Pony: Equestria Girls – Sunset's Backstage Pass is a 2019 Flash animated one-hour television special based on Hasbro's My Little Pony: Equestria Girls toyline and media franchise, which is a spin-off of the 2010 relaunch of Hasbro's My Little Pony toyline. Written by Whitney Ralls and directed by Ishi Rudell and Katrina Hadley, it is the fourth one-hour Equestria Girls special, following Forgotten Friendship (2018), Rollercoaster of Friendship (2018), Spring Breakdown (2019), and preceding Holidays Unwrapped (2019).

This was also the first of the one-hour Equestria Girls specials not to be written by Nick Confalone, who wrote and edited the previous three, but he remained on as editor. Same for Holidays Unwrapped, which was not written by Confalone, but he remained on as editor

The special aired on Discovery Family on July 27, 2019.

Plot
The Equestria Girls travel to the Starswirled Music Festival, a two-day live music event. Sunset Shimmer and Pinkie Pie are excited at the prospect of a reunion performance by PostCrush, their favorite pop duo, comprising vocalist/guitarist Kiwi Lollipop (K-Lo) and drummer Supernova Zap (Su-Z). Throughout the first day, Sunset deals with a number of minor annoyances, many of which involve an easily distracted Pinkie. The two are expelled from the festival after Pinkie destroys a churro vendor's cart, and Sunset angrily rejects Pinkie's attempted apology. As she sits despondently on a hilltop overlooking the site, a blast of magical energy suddenly washes over her.

When Sunset wakes up the next morning, she finds that she is reliving the first day of the festival. She tries to keep Pinkie from being sidetracked, but Pinkie again breaks the churro cart and gets both of them expelled. On the next repetition of the day, Sunset leaves Pinkie behind and gets a front-row spot to see PostCrush perform, unaware of Pinkie's heartbreak and the other girls' disapproval of her decision.

Sunset is shocked to discover that she is still reliving the same day time after time, despite having achieved her goal, and blames Pinkie for the situation. She commandeers the recreational vehicle in which she and her friends are camping and tries to flee the site, but it breaks down and leaves her stuck in the time loop. The next day, Sunset sends a message to Princess Twilight Sparkle in Equestria. Twilight replies by telling Sunset the time loop is caused by a magical Equestrian artifact called the Time Twirler. Sunset decides to find whoever is using the artifact and bring an end to the time loop.

The lyrics of a song by the Sirens lead Sunset and her friends to believe that they are using the Time Twirler, but Adagio Dazzle explains to Sunset that they never regained their magic after losing it and have nothing to do with the time loop. Resolving to treat Pinkie better, Sunset indulges her in a range of activities on the next repetition. The two sneak backstage to meet PostCrush and discover the pair found the Time Twirler on the night before the festival. They have been using its spell to reset the day every time something goes wrong with their set, in order to deliver a flawless performance.

A security guard expels Sunset and Pinkie at PostCrush's request, but later readmits them. They confront the duo just as the show begins; Pinkie knocks the Time Twirler off K-Lo's hair bow and Sunset destroys it, permanently breaking its spell. K-Lo and Su-Z despair over no longer being able to repeat the day, but Sunset reassures them that their fans just want to see them performing and having fun. The duo expresses remorse for their actions and reconcile, putting on a lively show with Sunset and Pinkie.

The next morning, Sunset is delighted to discover it is now the second day of the festival. Remarking that she has been stuck in the loop for three weeks, she sets out to enjoy the day with Pinkie.

Cast
 Rebecca Shoichet - Sunset Shimmer
 Andrea Libman - Pinkie Pie and Fluttershy
 Ashleigh Ball - Applejack and Rainbow Dash
 Tara Strong - Twilight Sparkle / Princess Twilight Sparkle
 Tabitha St. Germain - Rarity
 Lili Beaudoin - K-Lo
 Mariee Devereux - Su-Z

Other Voices
 Andrea Libman - Sweetie Drops
 Ashleigh Ball - Lyra Heartstrings
 Tabitha St. Germain - PostCrush Announcer
 Kazumi Evans - Adagio Dazzle
 Diana Kaarina - Aria Blaze
 Maryke Hendrikse - Sonata Dusk
 Kathleen Barr - Puffed Pastry
 Lee Tockar - Snips, Festival Artist / Intern
 Michael Dobson - Security Guard

Featured Singers
 Marie Hui - K-Lo
 Arielle Tuliao - Su-Z
 Shylo Sharity - Aria Blaze
 Shannon Chan-Kent - Pinkie Pie, Sonata Dusk

Merchandise
A novel adaptation titled My Little Pony: Equestria Girls: Make Your Own Magic: Starswirl Do-Over was published on February 5, 2019.

Release
Sunset's Backstage Pass aired on July 27, 2019 on Discovery Family. The special was edited down into a cut of six episodes on the official My Little Pony YouTube channel. Its first episode was uploaded on September 17, 2019 and its last episode on October 13.

Episodes

References

My Little Pony: Friendship Is Magic
2019 television specials
2010s animated television specials
Films about music festivals
Time loop films
Equestria Girls films